De Carle or de Carle is a surname sometimes used as a middle name. Notable people with this name include the following:

Surname
Lancelot de Carle (c. 1508 – 1568), French scholar, poet and diplomat
Nichole de Carle (born 1984), British fashion designer

Middle name
Arthur de Carle Sowerby (1885 –1954), British naturalist, explorer, writer, and publisher
James De Carle Sowerby (1787 – 1871), British mineralogist, botanist, and illustrator

See also

Carle, surnames
Carle (given name)
de Carli
De Carlo